The 2019 BUBBA Burger Sports Car Grand Prix was a sports car race sanctioned by the International Motor Sports Association (IMSA). It was held at Long Beach street circuit in Long Beach, California on 13 April 2019. The race was the third round of the 2019 WeatherTech SportsCar Championship.

Background
This event was run in conjunction with the Grand Prix of Long Beach in the IndyCar Series, held a day after the IMSA event, on 14 April.

On 4 April 2019, IMSA released a technical bulletin regarding the Balance of Performance for the race. In the Daytona Prototype International (DPi) class, the Acura ARX-05 was made 20 kilograms lighter, and received an increase in turbo boost, along with the Nissan DPi. The Mazda RT24-P was restricted in its boost, while being made five kilograms lighter. The Cadillac DPi-V.R, which won the previous two events of the 2019 season, was given a 10 kilogram increase. In GT Le Mans (GTLM), there were less significant changes. The Porsche 911 RSR was lightened by 10 kilograms, while the Ford GT had a slight reduction in boost.

Entries

On 3 April 2019, the entry list for the event was released, featuring 19 cars in total. There were 11 cars in the Daytona Prototype International class, and eight entries in GT Le Mans (GTLM). The Le Mans Prototype (LMP2) and GT Daytona (GTD) classes would not be participating in the event. There were few changes to the full-season lineups in either class. Kyle Kaiser, who joined the #50 Juncos Racing Cadillac DPi-V.R for the 24 Hours of Daytona, returned to the car alongside full-season driver Will Owen on a one-race deal. The Thursday before the race, it was announced one of Ford Chip Ganassi Racing's full-season drivers, Joey Hand, would be unable to compete due to suffering symptoms of the flu. His place would be taken by one of their endurance-event drivers, Sébastien Bourdais, who would also be competing in the IndyCar event.

Practice and qualifying

Qualifying Results 

 Car number 55 was moved to the back of the DPi field as a result of Jonathan Bomarito's crash in Turn 6 during qualifying. A crack was found in the car's monocoque chassis which required the team to rebuild the car using the team's spare tub. In accordance with Article 23.5.3 of the IMSA Sporting Regulations the car was moved to the back of the starting grid in its class.

Results

References

External links

Grand Prix of Long Beach
BUBBA Burger Sports Car Grand Prix
BUBBA Burger Sports Car Grand Prix
BUBBA Burger Sports Car Grand Prix